The candidate information for the Claydon and Barham Ward in Mid-Suffolk, Suffolk, England. This ward selected two councillors.

Councillors

2011 Results

2015 Results
The turnout of the election was 68.98% and the Conservatives won both seats.

2019 Results
The turnout of the election was 30.98% and the Conservatives won both seats.

See also
Mid Suffolk local elections

References

External links
Mid Suffolk Council

Wards of Mid Suffolk District